The 1824 United States presidential election in Virginia took place between October 26 and December 2, 1824, as part of the 1824 United States presidential election. Voters chose 24 representatives, or electors to the Electoral College, who voted for President and Vice President.

During this election, the Democratic-Republican Party was the only major national party, and 4 candidates from this party sought the Presidency. Virginia voted for William H. Crawford over John Quincy Adams, Andrew Jackson, and Henry Clay. Crawford won Virginia by a margin of 33.44%.

Results

References

Virginia
1824
1824 Virginia elections